The Suzuki SX4 is a subcompact car and crossover produced by Japanese automaker Suzuki since 2006. A successor of the Aerio tall hatchback and sedan, the first-generation model was available as a hatchback and sedan, with the former available in both front- and four-wheel drive and as a rebadged version in Europe called the Fiat Sedici.

In 2013, the second generation was launched, called Suzuki SX4 S-Cross (or Suzuki S-Cross in India)— now exclusively a subcompact crossover SUV. The first- and second-generation SX4s sold alongside one another until 2014. The SX4 sedan was replaced with the Suzuki Ciaz. The third-generation model was introduced in 2021 as a heavily modified version of the previous model and was only produced in Hungary for the European market. For the Indian market, the S-Cross was replaced by the taller Grand Vitara.

The SX4 is an abbreviation of "Sports X-over 4 Seasons". The SX4 designation was previously used by American Motors Corporation (AMC) from the 1981 through 1983 model years for a sporty liftback model in its line of all-wheel-drive AMC Eagle passenger cars. While the "S-Cross" suffix is an abbreviation of Smart Crossover.

First generation (GY/EY/RW; 2006) 

The SX4 continues Suzuki's focus on mini SUVs and subcompact SUVs, like Jimny/SJ, and Vitara/Escudo. The car was created as a result of a joint development agreement between Suzuki and Fiat signed in April 2003. It was introduced in Japan on 1 December 2005, and internationally at the 76th Geneva Motor Show in March 2006. Designed by Giorgetto Giugiaro's Italdesign studio, the SX4 replaces the Aerio (Liana in some markets). Although originally intended solely for Europe, the SX4 is sold in most of Suzuki's international markets. Especially as a 4WD hatchback, the SX4 occupies a specific market niche of mini SUVs. Depending on the market, it was available with petrol engines in the 1.0 to 2.0 L range, and Fiat/Peugeot's 1.3 to 2.0 L diesels.

Based on the Suzuki Swift, it was manufactured at the Magyar Suzuki plant in Esztergom, Hungary; Manesar, India; Bekasi, Indonesia; Chongqing, China and Sagara, Japan. Production in Hungary was expected to be 60,000 units per year — two-thirds to be sold by Suzuki and one-third by Fiat, badged as the Sedici.

The SX4 Crossover had also been sold in Indonesia since 2007. Earlier models were directly imported from Japan and marketed as the SX4 X-Over. However, locally assembled versions were introduced a year later due to higher market demand. The locally assembled versions were then equipped with four-wheel disc brakes and a multi-information display. The Indonesian-produced SX4 was also exported to Thailand. The SX4 sedan was also sold in Indonesia as the Suzuki Neo Baleno from 2008 until 2011.

The SX4 was initially released as a five-door hatchback body style, marketed as the SX4 Crossover. With boot space of 300 L (270 L VDA) and 60:40 split-fold rear seats, they have a tumble/roll configuration that allows for a flat load area up to a maximum volume of 1045 L(625 L VDA).

The sedan model, marketed as the SX4 Sport, debuted at the 2007 New York International Auto Show and was released in Japan, India, and a few Eastern European markets. It replaced the Suzuki Aerio sedan and also the Daewoo-based Suzuki Forenza sedan and station wagon.

Yearly history 
2007
The North American market model arrived in 2006 for the 2007 model year, as Suzuki's entry-level AWD vehicle. Differences from the European model are the offering of AWD as standard (2WD Version available in Canada, Europe, Israel, and China while AWD is optional in Canada) and only with the 2.0 L J20A  I4 gasoline engine with a timing chain instead of a timing belt. The cars were only available with a 4-speed Aisin 60-40LE automatic transmission in 2007.

In 2007, Suzuki Auto posted the best year-end close in company history, with SX4 sales a primary contributor to this success.

2008
The United States base model year 2008 was the five-door hatchback (marketed as the SX4 Crossover) and included "intelligent" All Wheel Drive (iAWD), power door locks, power windows, power mirrors, CD player with MP3 capability, and keyless entry. Available were anti-lock brakes, traction control, stability control, fog lights, and an advanced key in a Touring package. Suzuki sold nearly 75,000 Suzuki SX4s and Fiat Sedicis in Europe in 2008. This was the second best-selling car in Hungary in 2008, after the Suzuki Swift.

Suzuki Indonesia launched the Suzuki SX4 X-Road, a base variant of the SX4 in Indonesia. This version uses rear drum brakes (disc on non CBU X-Over), unique wheels, a body kit, and no rear spoiler.

2009
The model year of 2009 saw SX4 sedans with standard GPS navigation systems manufactured by Garmin with Bluetooth, weather, and a gas station locator.

The United States sedan of the SX4 (marketed as the SX4 Sport) is only available in front-wheel drive (FWD). Except for the absence of iAWD, the option packages for the SX4 Sport closely matched those available for the SX4 Crossover. The sedan's boot has 515 liters of cargo capacity.

Both the 1.6 L FWD hatchback and 1.6 L FWD sedan models available in Israel (four-speed automatic only) and Malaysia, are fully imported from Japan.

Both two-wheel drive and all-wheel drive versions of the SX4 are available, although not all combinations of drivetrain and body style may be available in a given market (for instance, until the latter part of the model year of 2008, the United States SX4 Crossover was only available with iAWD).

2010
The 2010 SX4 received changes to the grille, instrument cluster, climate controls, and door trim, as well as a restructured cargo hold, removing the fold-up rear seats in favor of an 'arena seating' raised rear seat layout. Non-fleet all-wheel-drive models added new rear skid plates. They were also upgraded with front (ventilated) and rear (solid) disc brakes, six airbags (front, side, and curtain), Anti-lock Braking System (ABS), cruise control and Electronic Stability Program (ESP) - optional in 1.6 L models.

A SportBack model offered a lowered sport-tuned suspension, body kit, and a rear spoiler, but does include a roof rack.

Since the 2010 model year, the SX4 five-door hatchback is available with a 1.6 L DOHC VVT engine, 2.0 L DOHC VVT engine J20B (different from the J20A used from 2007 through 2009, and thus not interchangeable) and 2.0 L DDiS diesel engine (16-valve,  with  torque) on the AWD version.

The 1.6 L DOHC VVT engine revised to the new CO2 emission control standards Euro 5 regulations.

The car is available with either a new six-speed manual or a four-speed automatic transmission for 1.6 L engined cars. The continuously variable transmission (CVT) with paddle shifters comes with a 2.0 L inline-four engine and is rated  at 6000 rpm. With the standard six-speed manual transmission, the same engine is rated  at 6200 rpm.

The Indonesian-market SX4 received updates, including a new speedometer, a redesigned dashboard, new road wheels, grille design, mid-bass speaker, HID projector headlamps, and an AUX port on the head unit. The X-Road variant was discontinued due to low sales.

2012
Suzuki Indonesia launched a new variant, named RC1. The SX4 RC1 included more accessories, such as new bumpers, a rear upper spoiler, twin mufflers, 17-inch wheels, and LED headlamps.

Stability control and rear disc brakes became standard on all US models including FWD models (previously was standard only on AWD models).

The second facelift occurred with a new front bumper and a wider grille.

2013
Navigation was added as an optional feature on US models and the front fascia was redesigned. This was the last model year for US and Canada sales.

2014 
Last model year for this generation in most other markets except for China.

Engines 

 i-AWD=Intelligent All Wheel Drive System

Maruti Suzuki version 

In 2007, Maruti Suzuki launched the Indian version of the SX4 sedan with minor cosmetic differences compared to the models assembled and marketed elsewhere.

It was later updated to the 1.6 L engine with VVT.

Maruti introduced a compressed natural gas (CNG) factory-fitted kit in August 2010.

In February 2011, a diesel version was introduced. It uses the Fiat 1.3 L (DDiS) engine with variable geometry turbo.

SX4-FCV 

An experimental Suzuki concept car using alternative power includes an 80 kW hydrogen fuel cell and 68 kW electric motor. The car was unveiled in 2008 Hokkaido Tōyako summit, and later in 2008 Paris International Motor Show.

Suzuki SX4 WRC 

At the 2007 Geneva Motor Show, Suzuki announced it would enter the FIA World Rally Championship, with the factory-backed Suzuki World Rally Team in the World Rally Car category in 2007, using the Suzuki SX4 WRC.

Safety 
The SX4 achieved four stars safety rating from Euro NCAP in 2006.

Second generation (JY; 2013) 

Suzuki unveiled the S-Cross Concept at the Paris Motor Show in September 2012, a version of a subcompact crossover as an introduction for an upcoming production model. At that time, Suzuki announced that the S-Cross would be a new model, not a replacement for SX4, whose production was scheduled to continue.

A new SX4 S-Cross design, loosely based on the S-Cross concept, was unveiled at the 2013 Geneva Motor Show. The wheelbase measures , or  more than the earlier model. These dimensions provided additional interior and boot space,  compared with  liters. The SX4 S-Cross is built at the Magyar Suzuki plant in Hungary. Production of the old SX4 was continued in parallel until 2015 in Japan and India.

All SX4 S-Cross models get FWD as standard with optional AWD dubbed as "AllGrip". It has four selectable driving modes and is claimed to send torque to the rear wheels before a loss in traction can occur.

The European model went on sale in the autumn of 2013. Early models include the choice of 1.6 L M16A petrol engine from the previous generation or a new Fiat Multijet 1.6 L turbo-diesel engine, mated with 5- or 6-speed manual (all engines) or CVT (petrol only) transmission. The new model is Suzuki only, and Fiat replaced the Sedici with the new 500X.

The SX4 S-Cross is not available in the United States and Canada, since Suzuki has withdrawn from these markets, but it is offered in Brazil and Mexico. It has been launched in India in September 2015, as the Maruti Suzuki S-Cross via NEXA outlets only with the 1.3 L DDiS 200 and 1.6 L DDiS 320 Fiat's turbodiesel engines, mated with 5- and 6-speed manual transmissions respectively.

In June 2015, the European market S-Cross received new hydraulically controlled clutches and gear changes for the 6-speed twin-clutch automated-manual transmission, dubbed as "Twin Clutch System by Suzuki (TCSS)". It is only available for the 1.6 L DDiS turbo-diesel engine with an all-wheel-drive "AllGrip" model.

For the Indonesian market, the SX4 S-Cross was launched at the 24th Gaikindo Indonesia International Auto Show on 11 August 2016, being fully imported from India. Unique for this market, the car is powered by 1.5 L M15A petrol engine from the previous generation SX4 to avoid the higher tax imposed to vehicles with engine capacity more than 1500 cc (lifted in late 2021). The engine is mated to either a 5-speed manual or 6-speed automatic transmission. In terms of styling and features, the car is almost identical to the Indian market S-Cross.

Facelift 
The SX4 S-Cross design was updated in September 2016 with numerous improvements. The car received a new front-end design, tail lights, alloy wheels with 10-mm wider tires, and more efficient headlights, the position lamps now have energy-saving LEDs and function as daytime running lights. The interior design utilizes an updated soft-touch dashboard pad, framing highlights for the center panel, and newly designed seat fabric.

Brand new direct injection turbocharged "Boosterjet" engine series was also introduced. The inline-three 1.0 L K10C rated at  /  and inline-four 1.4 L K14C rated at  / . It is shared with the Vitara and Swift. The new 1.4 L turbo engine received slightly different ancillaries and ECU and complied with the Euro 6 emission standards. During development, Suzuki's engineers virtually eliminated the typical delay in turbo power delivery by installing the specially developed compact turbocharger attached directly to the cylinder head as well as incorporating the exhaust manifold into the cylinder head casting. This design ensures optimum gas flow with minimal heat loss through to the turbo unit. The turbocharger has a boost pressure of 1.1 Bar. The 1.0 L engine is mated to a 5-speed manual as standard, with a 6-speed manual for the 1.4 L engine, while the 6-speed automatic transmission is also available both engines. For most markets outside Europe, the 1.6 L petrol engine is still available instead of the new 1.0 L "Boosterjet" turbo engine for the lower model. It is only available with a 6-speed automatic transmission, replacing both 5-speed manual and CVT transmissions.

The facelifted S-Cross was launched in August 2017 in Ecuador. It was offered through Chevrolet, but still marketed with Suzuki's badges. Chevrolet stopped offering S-Cross when Suzuki re-entered the Ecuadorian market in August 2021.

Both petrol and diesel engines in Europe were discontinued in April 2020 and replaced with a turbocharged 1.4 L K14D "Boosterjet SHVS" mild hybrid engine due to the implementation of European 6d emission standard. The engine received a dual VVT system, new design fuel injectors, and a higher-pressure fuel pump. It is now rated at  / . The mild hybrid system consists of a 48V lithium-ion battery, Integrated Starter Generator (ISG), and 48V-12V (DC/DC) converter to power components requiring lower voltage including lights, audio, and air conditioning. The ISG acts as both a generator and starter motor, is belt driven, and assists the petrol engine during vehicle take off. This system adds  / .

The facelifted version of the SX4 S-Cross was launched in India on 28 September 2017. The 1.6 L DDiS 320 turbo-diesel engine was not available for the facelifted model and only available in a mild hybrid setup, with a 48V belted alternator-starter unit coupled to the 1.3 L DDiS 200 turbo-diesel engine and a 5-speed manual transmission. Due to BS6 norms being implemented since 1 April 2020, the diesel was discontinued. A petrol model was introduced in August 2020 with a 1.5 L K15B engine with 12V mild hybrid and an option of a 4-speed automatic transmission. In 2017, the Indian S-Cross contains over 95% local parts.

Safety 
The SX4 S-Cross achieved a maximum five-star Euro NCAP safety rating when it was first released in 2013. The same result was also issued by ANCAP in 2013 and ASEAN NCAP in 2015.

Third generation (2021) 

Suzuki unveiled the third-generation SX4 S-Cross online on 25 November 2021. It is continued to be manufactured by Magyar Suzuki in Hungary for the European market and also exported to Asia, Oceania and Latin America. It was designed by Suzuki Italia Design Center in Turin.

The car is heavily based on the previous generation model, with a major makeover on the exterior with a new front and rear-end design. In the interior, it received an updated dashboard design, a gauge cluster with a 4.2-inch LCD multi-info display from Vitara, and either a 7- or 9-inch floating design touchscreen infotainment system. The driver assistance system is also upgraded with additional 360 degrees view camera, blind spot monitoring, and rear cross-traffic alert. The exterior dimensions and interior space remain exactly the same as the previous generation.

Powertrain 
The turbocharged 1.4 L direct injection engine with belt-driven 48V Integrated Starter Generator (ISG) mild hybrid system is also carried over from the previous model for the European market. It is paired with either a 6-speed manual or automatic transmission and is available for both front-wheel or all-wheel-drive configurations. Strong hybrid version with Motor Generator Unit (MGU) and automated manual transmission "Auto Gear Shift (AGS)" that was seen in 2022 Vitara/Escudo Hybrid is expected to come in summer 2022. The old conventional 1.4 L turbocharged engine from the previous generation is retained for markets outside Europe.

The combined fuel consumption for the 1.4 L turbo mild hybrid engine is claimed more economical than its predecessor and competitors. The car achieved fuel economy rating between  depending on drive layout and transmission option, according to WLTP test.

Sales

SX4

SX4 S-Cross

References

External links 

SX4
Cars introduced in 2006
2010s cars
2020s cars
Subcompact cars
Hatchbacks
Sedans
Mini sport utility vehicles
Crossover sport utility vehicles
Front-wheel-drive vehicles
All-wheel-drive vehicles
Vehicles with CVT transmission
ANCAP small family cars
ASEAN NCAP small family cars
Euro NCAP small family cars